Liparis elegans is a species of orchids. It is found in South East Asia (Indonesia, Papua New Guinea).

References

elegans
Plants described in 1828